The Đuro Đaković Series 732 is a 44-ton diesel-hydraulic switcher model locomotive series.

References 

 Valter, Z. Dizel-električna lokomotiva, Zagreb (1984); Unknown ID: 02-892/1-1984

External links 
 2132 - Diesel-hydraulic shunter Railfan Europe

C locomotives
732
732
Diesel locomotives of Yugoslavia
Railway locomotives introduced in 1969
Đuro Đaković (company)
Standard gauge locomotives of Croatia
Standard gauge locomotives of Slovenia
Standard gauge locomotives of Yugoslavia